Burundi is a Central African nation that is closely linked with Rwanda, geographically, historically and culturally. The drum such as the karyenda is one of central importance. Internationally, the country has produced the music group Royal Drummers of Burundi. 

Burundian-Belgian musicians like Éric Baranyanka from the Burundese royal family, Ciza Muhirwa and, especially, Khadja Nin, have more recently gained prominence. Since the music is from the mind and soul, it mainly expresses what the people in Burundi feel and what they think when they beat the drums.

One feature of Burundian men's folk songs is the presence of an inanga, a type of stringed zither.

Other instruments include:
 Ingoma drums, made from tree trunks
 The umwironge, a type of flute usually made from the stem of an intomvu plant
 The igihuha, a horn made from antelope horn
 The ikinyege, a rattle made from a gourd of the igicuma plant
 The iyebe, a rattle with threaded, dried, hollowed-out inyege fruit pods
 The inzogera, a closed bell classified as an idiophone, similar to the amayugi
 The umudende, a narrow cylindrical bell formed by bending a thin iron sheet into a narrow cylinder, with a hook of metal attached at top
 The ikembe, technically a lamellaphone consisting of a series of iron lamellae fixed to a rectangular wooden soundbox
 The indingiti, a stringed instrument classified as a fiddle
 The idono, a musical bow consisting of a string (umurya) supported by a flexible wooden string bearer or bow (umuheto)

Burundi beat 
The so-called diverse Burundi beat, filled with distinctive drumming created by Burundi's tribal musicians and recorded by French anthropologists, was used to create unique music by English pop bands Adam and the Ants and Bow Wow Wow.

Further reading
Jacquemin, Jean-Pierreh, Jadot Sezirahigha and Richard Trillo. "Echoes from the Hills" 2000. In Broughton, Simon and Ellingham, Mark with McConnachie, James and Duane, Orla (Ed.), World Music, Vol. 1: Africa, Europe and the Middle East, pp 608-612. Rough Guides Ltd, Penguin Books.

References